The Edith River is a river of Fiordland, New Zealand. It rises to the west of the Edith Saddle and flows westward into Lake Alice, which drains into George Sound.

See also
List of rivers of New Zealand

References

Land Information New Zealand - Search for Place Names

Rivers of Fiordland